The Wam Bam Club is a cabaret and burlesque show. It is staged every Friday night as "Wam Bam Late" at the Hippodrome, London and every Saturday night as Wam Bam Riviera aboard the R. S. Hispaniola on the Embankment with host/curator Lady Alex and resident acts the Wam Bam Belles. Guests can take part in a burlesque class beforehand and meals are served during the show.

Since it started in 2006, the show has moved from its origins at the Battersea Barge to the Soho Revue Bar, then the Cafe de Paris for five years, then the Bloomsbury Ballroom  in 2014. Its current home is The Hippodrome in Leicester Square & the R. S. Hispaniola on the Embankment. The show is sponsored by lingerie brand What Katie Did.

Acts 
With a rotating line up every week, The Wam Bam, Club has played host tostand up comedians, burlesque artists, magicians and musicians including:
 EastEnd Cabaret
 Jack Whitehall
 Milton Jones
 Scales of the Unexpected
 Pippa Evans
 Ninia Benjamin
 Banbury Cross
 Ruby Deshabille
 Sam Wills
 Christian Lee
 Millie Dollar
 Craig the Incredible Hula Boy
 Missy Malone
 Chris Cox (entertainer)

Notes and references

External links

The Official Website of The Wam Bam Club
The Official Website of the R. S. Hispaniola
The Official Website of The Bloomsbury Ballroom

Comedy clubs in the United Kingdom
Nightclubs in London
Burlesque theatres